The May Company Building (a.k.a. Macy's Mission Valley building) at 1702 Camino del Rio North, Westfield Mission Valley shopping center in San Diego is an example of original modernist architecture. The building originally housed the May Company California department store branch in the center, which would later become Robinsons-May in 1993, then Macy's in 2006 until it was closed in 2017. It is currently empty.

The May Company Building at Mission Valley was designed in 1959 and opened in 1961. It was designed by William S. (Bill) Lewis, Jr. for LA-based AC Martin (later of Deems-Lewis), Frank L. Hope & Associates backstopped the project locally. It has been described by San Diego architectural photographer and historian Darren Bradley as an architectural icon, a "jewel box with a unique texture … striking architecture … the cladding all the way around the building … (is in) a modernist design that plays with light and shadow … designed to grab attention." This was part of a modernist landscape established in the area in the 1960s. As of January 2017, Westfield was considering a number of different plans for the use of the building.

A 2015 study by the City of San Diego concluded that the building meets several criteria for qualification for the San Diego Resources register: an example of community development and of an identifiable architectural style (Modern Contemporary architecture of 1955–1965). However the report stated that the building did not qualify because of the lack of integrity of the original construction, due to replacement of some original tiles, altered walls, covering up of the building by new retail space set in front of it, removal of original pop-out display windows and "May Co." signage, and demolition of the 1958 canopy and columns, thus all together the alteration of more than 50% of the surface area of the original building exterior. It also did not qualify because it is not the "identifiable work" of a "listed Master Architect".

References

Modernist architecture in California
Buildings and structures in San Diego
Retail buildings in California
Mission Valley, San Diego
May Company buildings
May Company California